Allavaram is a village in Allavaram Mandal, Dr. B.R. Ambedkar Konaseema district in the state of Andhra Pradesh in India. It is located in Allavaram mandal of Amalapuram revenue division of the district.

References 

Villages in Allavaram mandal